Jaime Bellavista was a Spanish footballer who played as a forward for FC Espanya. The dates of his birth and death are unknown. He was one of the most outstanding players in the 1914 Pyrenees Cup, being the tournament's top scorer with a total of 5 goals, including one in a 3–1 win over Cométe et Simot in the final.

Club career
Born in Catalonia, he was one of the most prominent players of FC Espanya in the 1910s, being a member of the team's attacking quintet which also had Pantaleón Salvó, Antonio Baró, Mario Passani and Jaime Villena, and together with them, he helped the team win three Catalan championships (1912–13, 1913–14 and 1916–17) and then helped the club reach their first (and only) Copa del Rey final in 1914, but they lost 1–2 to Athletic Bilbao, courtesy of a brace from Severino Zuazo.

The highlight of his career came on 29 March 1914 in the semi-finals of the 1914 Pyrenees Cup, in which Espanya faced city rivals FC Barcelona at the Camp de la Indústria, who had the tournament in the previous four occasions and was looking forward to making it five in a row, however, Bellavista netted four goals to help his team to a resounding 5–2 win, and thus Espanya become the first-ever team to knock-out Barça from the competition. Bellavista went on to score a fifth goal in the final to help his side to a 3–1 victory over Cométe et Simot. These five goals were enough to not only make him the tournament's top scorer, but also the shared all-time top scorer in the competition's history alongside Antonio Morales, who also netted 5 goals in the Pyrenees Cup.

Honours

Club
FC Espanya
Catalan championship:
Champions (3): 1912–13, 1913–14 and 1916–17

Copa del Rey:
Runner-up (1): 1914

Pyrenees Cup:
Champions (1): 1914

Individual
Top goalscorer of the 1914 Pyrenees Cup with 5 goals

Records
Most goals in a single Pyrenees Cup tournament: 5 goals in 1914 
All-time top goal scorer of the Pyrenees Cup: 5 goals

References

Year of birth missing
Year of death missing
Spanish footballers
Footballers from Catalonia
Association football forwards